"Shakin' It 4 Daddy" (sometime rendered as "Shakin' It for Daddy") is a song recorded by American singer Robin Thicke for his fourth studio album, Sex Therapy: The Session (2009). It features rap verses by hip hop artist Nicki Minaj. The song was written by Thicke, Jamal Jones, Ester Dean and Minaj, while production was handled by Jones under his stage name Polow da Don.

Background and production 

"Shakin' It 4 Daddy" was written by Robin Thicke, Jamal Jones, Ester Dean and Nicki Minaj, while the production was done by Jones under his stage name Polow da Don. American rapper Jay-Z recommended Minaj to be a featured artist on Thicke's song on which she eagerly accepted, "[I] cannot put into words how I felt when he told me that. [Robin] was like, 'By the way, let me tell you this great story.'" In an interview with MTV News, Thicke also explained how the collaboration happened, "We were in the studio and I played him [Jay-Z] the whole album. He was like, 'You should get Nicki Minaj on that. She's got that voice. She's got that swag.'" They immediately called her when she accepted to provide her vocals on the song. Thicke further commented on Minaj, "I can't wait to do a video with Nicki. There's a power in her. It's not just that she's sexy and that's the only way she can get you to like her. She's got charm – not just sex. Some women may use sex to get what they want; others have charm. She's got charm." Jeremy Stevenson served as a recording engineer of "Shakin' It 4 Daddy" and recorded it at Thom Thom Studios. Minaj appears as courtesy of Young Money, Cash Money Records and Universal Motown Records.

Although the song was originally planned to be released as a single in the United States, the release was later cancelled for unknown reasons. A promotional CD single was released in the US in 2009 and featured the dirty version, clean version, and the instrumental of the song. A digital remix by Manon Dave was released on February 8, 2011 via 7digital store, in several countries worldwide including Australia, Canada, France, Germany, Spain, the United Kingdom and the United States.

Composition 

"Shakin' It 4 Daddy" is a club song with a duration of three minutes and fifty-two seconds. A reviewer of MuchMusic described the song as "R. Kelly-meets-Usher party record that is Thicke's Southern-style hip-hop homage to the strip club and nightclub generation." In "Shakin' It 4 Daddy", Thicke sings about a "booty-shakin' mami".

Critical response 
Andy Kellman of Allmusic called the song "humorously awkward". He explained that its "oft-repeated hook" ("She shakin’ it for daddy, she shakin’ it for me") could make some listeners "think of Thicke and his father instead of just Thicke". According to Kyle Jarmon of Parlé Magazine, Thicke and Minaj work well together in the song. Mark Edward Nero of About.com cited "Shakin' It 4 Daddy" as the only "real failure" of Sex Therapy, declaring the song to be out-of-character for Thicke, as it sounds more like a song that Justin Timberlake may have recorded. Writing for PopMatters, Tyler Lewis declared that "Shakin' It 4 Daddy" contains "pretty standard Polow da Don production", but that it succeeds in "rendering all the lyrics meaningless". He concluded that "it's the rhythm of the language that you respond to", not its lyrics. August Brown of the Los Angeles Times declared "Shakin' It 4 Daddy" to be déclassé by Thicke's standards.

Live performances 
Thicke and Minaj performed the song numerous times, including on BET's 106 & Park in December 2009 and on the Late Show with David Letterman in February 2010.

Track listings 
Promotional CD single
"Shakin' It 4 Daddy" (Dirty Version) – 2:52
"Shakin' It 4 Daddy" (Clean Version) – 2:52
"Shakin' It 4 Daddy" (Instrumental) – 2:52

'Digital download (remix)
"Shakin' It 4 Daddy" (Manon Dave Remix) – 4:00

Credits and personnel 

Credits adapted from the liner notes of Sex Therapy.
Locations
Vocals recorded at Thom Thom Studios

Personnel
Robin Thicke – vocals, songwriter
Nicki Minaj – vocals, songwriter
Ester Dean – songwriter
Polow da Don – songwriter, producer
Jeremy Stevenson – recording engineer

Release history

References 

2009 songs
Robin Thicke songs
Songs written by Robin Thicke
Songs written by Ester Dean
Song recordings produced by Polow da Don
Songs written by Nicki Minaj
Nicki Minaj songs
Star Trak Entertainment singles
Songs written by Polow da Don